Paul Owens (July 27, 1924 – October 17, 2002) was one of the foremost artists in African American gospel music, performing with The Dixie Hummingbirds, the Swan Silvertones and the Sensational Nightingales. Born in Greensboro, North Carolina, he started as a soloist with the Israelite Gospel Singers, the Baystate Gospel Singers and the Evangelist Singers, then joined a group known as the Nightingales (later the Sensational Nightingales, which featured Julius "June Cheeks") before moving to the Hummingbirds in 1948. Paired with Ira Tucker, they adopted a daring style, which they called "trickeration", in which they would mix melisma with intricate harmonies, sharing the lead while often improvising phrases.

Owens left the group in 1952 to join the Swan Silvertones, to whose aggressive shouting style he added the smooth harmonies and melodious tenor for which he was known as a member of the Hummingbirds. He later left them to join the Sensational Nightingales, for whom he sang as a baritone, then returned to the Hummingbirds in 1989.

Owens died aged 78.

Further reading
 Boyer, Horace Clarence,How Sweet the Sound: The Golden Age of Gospel Elliott and Clark, 1995, .
 Heilbut, Tony, The Gospel Sound: Good News and Bad Times Limelight Editions, 1997, .
 Zolten, Jerry, Great God A'Mighty! The Dixie Hummingbirds. Celebrating the Rise of Soul Gospel Music Oxford University Press, 2003, .

1924 births
2002 deaths
American gospel singers
Musicians from Philadelphia
20th-century African-American male singers